Thomas Lupton (16281684) was a founding settler of Norwalk, Connecticut. His name appears in the early records of the settlement, but little is known, and his name also disappears soon thereafter. He apparently came to Norwalk in 1655 from the New Haven Colony. He was named a freeman in 1664.

He settled on home-lot number 27, which was toward the rear of the main line of lots in the settlement. His daughter Hannah married Ebenezer Blakeley. Hannah and Ebenezer had a daughter also named Hannah who married John Nash, and together are the ancestors of prominent Nash family of Norwalk.

In July 1668, he was chosen by the settlement congregation to look after the children during church services, so as to keep "them from playing and unssivil behavior in time of public worship".

He is listed on the Founders Stone bearing the names of the founding settlers of Norwalk in the East Norwalk Historical Cemetery.

References 

1628 births
1684 deaths
American Puritans
Founding settlers of Norwalk, Connecticut
People from New Haven, Connecticut